John Beaumont (January 7, 1924 – September 19, 2000) was an American sports shooter. He competed in the 25 metre pistol event at the 1956 Summer Olympics.

References

1924 births
2000 deaths
American male sport shooters
Olympic shooters of the United States
Shooters at the 1956 Summer Olympics
Sportspeople from Minneapolis